Broadway Cinematheque is a cinema in Yau Ma Tei, Hong Kong, run by Broadway Circuit. Located in Prosperous Garden, a public housing estate, the cinema screens a wider spectrum of films including independent and art films than other cinemas in Hong Kong. The cinema hosts four houses with 476 seats (115 normal seats + 4 wheelchair seats per house). It also has a book store, Kubrick, which specializes in books about films, and has a café adjacent to it.

History
Broadway Cinematheque's building was designed by Gary Chang, who founded the EDGE Design Institute in 1994. The cinema opened on 20 November 1996, the day of the Garley Building fire in the adjoining Jordan neighbourhood, and as a result business on its first day was quite poor. 

The cinema's initial strategy of showing only art film proved to be unsustainable, and so around 2000 it began showing mainstream films on two of its four screens. It is owned by Edko Films, which according to Broadway Cinematheque director Gary Mak is content for the cinema to break even in order to grow an audience for non-mainstream film in Hong Kong. It has served as a venue for film festivals such as the Hong Kong Asian Film Festival.

See also
 List of cinemas in Hong Kong

References

External links

 Broadway Cinematheque website

Cinemas in Hong Kong
Yau Ma Tei